Sir Arthur George Stephenson (1890–1967), was an Australian architect.

Stephensen was born in 1890 at Box Hill, Victoria, Australia. 

In 1907 Stephenson worked for Swansson Brothers while studying construction at the Working Men's College. During World War I, he joined the Australian Imperial Force in 1915 as a lieutenant, promoted to captain and awarded the Military Cross. After the war, Stephenson remained in London and studied at the Architectural Association School (AA) and joined the Royal Institute of British Architects (RIBA) in 1920. He returned to Melbourne and established Stephenson & Meldrum in 1921.

Stephenson was largely responsible for Stephenson & Meldrum's direction to specialise in hospital and industrial architecture. He also lectured, wrote widely and was a member of numerous committees, including the International Hospitals Federation, the Hospital Advisory Council (Melbourne) and a trustee of the National Museum of Victoria. In 1954 Stephenson was knighted for services to architecture and was the first Australian to receive a RIBA Gold Medal in 1964. The Royal Australian Institute of Architects (RAIA) awarded him a gold medal in 1963 and was made honorary fellow by The American Institute of Architects in 1964.

References

Architects from Melbourne
1890 births
1967 deaths
20th-century Australian architects
People from Box Hill, Victoria
Australian recipients of the Military Cross
Australian military personnel of World War I
Military personnel from Melbourne
Fellows of the Royal Institute of British Architects
Australian Knights Bachelor
Fellows of the American Institute of Architects
Alumni of the Architectural Association School of Architecture